Dragović (Cyrillic: Драговић) is a Bosnian, Croatian, Montenegrin and Serbian patronymic surname, meaning "son of Drago". Notable people with the surname include:

Aleksandar Dragović (born 1991), Austrian footballer
Doris Dragović (born 1961), Croatian pop singer
Goran Dragović (born 1981), Bosnian footballer
Nikola Dragović (born 1987), Serbian basketball player
Vladimir Dragović (born 1967), scholar
Vojislav Dragović (born 1982), Serbian footballer
 surname from the Vasojevići clan

See also
Dragojević
Dragičević
Dragić

Bosnian surnames
Croatian surnames
Montenegrin surnames
Serbian surnames
Patronymic surnames